Ramsberg is a locality situated in Lindesberg Municipality, Örebro County, Sweden with 257 inhabitants in 2010.

Riksdag elections

References 

Populated places in Örebro County
Populated places in Lindesberg Municipality